Roger Marsh Blench (born August 1, 1953) is a British linguist, ethnomusicologist and development anthropologist. He has an M.A. and a Ph.D. from the University of Cambridge and is based in Cambridge, England. He researches, publishes, and works as a consultant.

Career
Blench is known for his wide-ranging interests and has made important contributions to African linguistics, Southeast Asian linguistics, anthropology, ethnomusicology, ethnobotany, and various other related fields. He has done significant research on the Niger–Congo, Nilo-Saharan, and Afroasiatic families, as well as the Arunachal languages. Additionally, Blench has published extensively on the relationship between linguistics and archaeology. Blench is currently engaged in a long-term project to document the languages of central Nigeria. He has also carried out extensive research on the herder–farmer conflicts in Nigeria. 

Blench collaborated with the late Professor Kay Williamson, who died in January 2005, and is now a trustee of the Kay Williamson Educational Foundation, which exists both to publish the unpublished material left by Kay Williamson and to promote the study of Nigerian languages. A series of publications supported by the trust is under way with Rüdiger Köppe Verlag in Cologne.

Blench has also conducted research and evaluations of international development activities worldwide, as a consultant and research fellow of the Overseas Development Institute in London.

Linguistic theories

Old North African languages

Old North African speakers, who have been misidentified as Paleoberbers and did not speak a language(s) that is linguistically related to existing Berber languages, were foragers of prehistoric North Africa that spoke a presently extinct set(s) of languages. Roger Blench coined the term, “Old North African,” to describe and distinguish earlier languages spoken in North Africa from later languages spoken by incoming Berber speakers, Punic speakers, and Arabic speakers.

History

From coastal North Africa to Iberia (e.g., Spain), ethnic groups spoke a set(s) of languages known as Old North African, which were not necessarily genetically related to one another. Ethnic groups of Iberia that spoke the Tartessian language may be considered Old North African speakers. Ethnic groups and the archaeological cultures of North Africa that came before the Capsian culture, ethnic groups of the Capsian culture, and ethnic groups of the Neolithic Maghreb are considered to be Old North African speakers. As large animals migrated into and across the Green Sahara, Old North African speakers, who hunted them as game animals, also migrated into and across the Sahara. The variety of cultures in the Maghreb described by Herodotus in 2500 BP may have been the cultural variety existing among Old North African speakers at that time.

In 300 BCE, Guanche speakers, who may have been Old North African speakers rather than Berber speakers, may have peopled the Canary Islands. Though speculative, Guanche speakers may have spoken the Basque language, Tartessian language, and other similar languages of the Iberian Peninsula; supportive evidence for this view may be found in the few lexemes that have been related to the Basque language and an absence of Berber etymology found in some Guanche words.

Due to the migration of incoming Arabic (e.g., Hassānīya), Berber (e.g., Tuareg), and Punic speakers, Old North African languages may have eventually ceased being spoken in North Africa.

Ancient Egyptian Language

Remnants of extinct Old North African languages may have been preserved in the ancient Egyptian language. For example, language contacts between Darfurian and Chadian proto-languages with the ancient Egyptian language. Additionally, the Tjehenou and Tjemehou, which may have been ethnic groups with cultures and languages distinct from one another, may have also had their languages preserved in the ancient Egyptian language.

Libyco-Berber Script

The Libyco-Berber script may be the result of a creolization process between the Berber and Old North African languages; this creolized language may reflect the linguistic connections between modern Berber speakers and Guanche speakers of the Canary Islands. Among many unknown elements found in rock engravings on the Canary Islands, some evidence (e.g., few basic lexicon, numbers) of the Punic language and Libyco-Berber script have been found. While the general view of the Berber languages being linguistically connected to the Guanche language is based largely on numerical evidence, it is also as probable that the affinity found between the languages are due to late-added Berber loanwords and that Guanche speakers were Old North African speakers. The Numidian language, which may have also been an Old North African language, constitutes the rock engravings in the Canary Islands.

Berber Languages

The internal diversity of the Berber languages are not able to be reconciled with how early the Neolithic (7000 BP, afterwards) and Capsian (12,000 BP - 8000 BP) periods occurred in North Africa; thus, these Neolithic and Capsian periods in North Africa are not able to be characterized as "Berber." The foundational vocabulary of the Berber languages, if not due to how long the Berber languages have been diverged from other Afroasiatic languages, may reflect inheritance from Old North African languages.

Descendant Languages

While possibly being Nilo-Saharan languages, the Nemadi and Dawada languages may also be descendant languages of the Old North African languages. Genetics may further inform the academic discussion about the connections between Old North African speakers and Nilo-Saharan speakers to the south of the Maghreb.

Selected books
 

 2000. Blench, R. M. & MacDonald, K. C., eds. The Origin and Development of African Livestock. London: University College Press.
 
 
 Sanchez-Mazas, Alicia; Blench, R. M. et al., eds. 2008. Human Migrations in Continental East Asia and Taiwan: matching archaeology, linguistics and genetics. London: Routledge.

References

External links
 

Linguists from the United Kingdom
Living people
1953 births
Alumni of Clare College, Cambridge
Paleolinguists
British Africanists
Linguists of Southeast Asian languages
Linguists of Nilo-Saharan languages
Linguists of Nilotic languages
Linguists of Niger–Congo languages
Linguists of Afroasiatic languages
Linguists of Sino-Tibetan languages
Linguists of Shompen
Linguists of Hrusish languages
Linguists of Vazimba
20th-century linguists
21st-century linguists